Robert "Roy" Rea (28 November 1934 – 5 April 2005) was a Northern Ireland international footballer who played in the Irish League as a goalkeeper with Glenavon and Glentoran. He won one 'B' cap, and four amateur caps for Northern Ireland and thirteen inter-league caps for the Irish League in the 1950s.

With Glenavon, he won the Irish League championship in 1956/57, two Irish Cups (1956/57 and 1958/59), one Gold Cup and one Ulster Cup. With Glentoran he won the Gold Cup in 1962/63; the same year in which he was named Ulster Footballer of the Year. In 1963, he played in the Eastern Canada Professional Soccer League with Toronto Italia.

Although he never won a full international cap, Rea was a member of the Northern Ireland squad at the 1958 World Cup, as the second reserve goalkeeper, but did not travel to Sweden.

References

External links
Northern Ireland's Footballing Greats

1934 births
2005 deaths
Association footballers from Northern Ireland
NIFL Premiership players
Ulster Footballers of the Year
1958 FIFA World Cup players
Glenavon F.C. players
Glentoran F.C. players
People from Banbridge
Toronto Italia players
Expatriate soccer players in Canada
Expatriate association footballers from Northern Ireland
Expatriate sportspeople from Northern Ireland in Canada
Eastern Canada Professional Soccer League players
Association football goalkeepers